Cymbalophora powelli is a moth of the family Erebidae first described by Charles Oberthür in 1910. It is found in Morocco and Algeria.

References

Callimorphina
Moths described in 1910